Bedichek is a surname. Notable people with the surname include:

Lillian Greer Bedichek (1885–1971), American educator, wife of Roy
Roy Bedichek (1878–1959), American writer, naturalist, and educator
Sarah Bedichek Pipkin (1913–1977), American geneticist, daughter of Lillian and Roy